Boronia galbraithiae, commonly known as the aniseed boronia or Galbraith's boronia, is a plant in the citrus family Rutaceae and is endemic to a small area in Victoria. It is an erect, woody, fennel-scented, hairless shrub with pinnate leaves and white to deep pink, four-petalled flowers arranged in groups in the leaf axils.

Description
The eight stamens are hairy and the style is about the same width as the stigma.

This boronia is similar to B. microphylla but differs in having glabrous branches.

Taxonomy and naming
Boronia galbraithiae was first formally described in 1993 by David Edward Albrecht who published the description in the journal Muelleria. The specific epithet (galbraithiae) honours Jean Galbraith who discovered the species.

Distribution and habitat
Aniseed boronia grows in dry forest near Mount Difficult in East Gippsland.

Conservation
Boronia galbraithiae is listed as "vulnerable" under the Australian Government Environment Protection and Biodiversity Conservation Act 1999 and the Victorian Government Flora and Fauna Guarantee Act 1988 and a recovery plan has been prepared. The main threats to the species include inappropriate fire regimes, roadworks and forestry operations.

References 

galbraithiae
Flora of Victoria (Australia)
Plants described in 1993